Shorea dyeri is a species of plant in the family Dipterocarpaceae. It is endemic to Sri Lanka.

Culture
Known as යකහලු දුන් (yakahalu dun) in Sinhala.

References

Flora of Sri Lanka
dyeri
Endangered plants
Taxonomy articles created by Polbot